Yeh Hai Chahatein ( This is my desired love) is an Indian Hindi-language drama television series produced by Ekta Kapoor for Star Plus. It is digitally available on Disney+ Hotstar. A spin-off to Yeh Hai Mohabbatein, the show premiered on 19 December 2019 and stars Sargun Kaur Luthra and Abrar Qazi.

Premise

A passionate love story between a famous rockstar, Rudraksh Khurana and a gynaecologist, Dr Preesha Srinivasan who fall in love after raising their respective siblings' son together.

20 years later
When destiny brings a reserved Nayantara and a famous rockstar Samrat together, will love blossom between them?

Plot

Cast

Main
Sargun Kaur Luthra as 
 Dr. Preesha Srinivasan Khurana: Gynaecologist; Rudraksh's wife; Ruhi and Samrat's mother; Saransh's aunt and adoptive mother; Vasudha and Gopal's daughter; Venky and Mahima's sister (2019–2022)
 Dr. Nayantara "Nayan" Khurana: Physiotherapist; Preesha’s look-alike, Samrat's wife; Malati's elder daughter; Ishaani's sister (2022–present)
Abrar Qazi as
 Rudraksh "Rudra" Khurana: Rockstar; Preesha's husband; Ruhi and Samrat's father; Saransh's uncle and adoptive father; Sulochana and Balraj's son; Rajeev's brother (2019–2022)
 Samrat "Sam" Khurana: Rockstar; Rudra's look-alike, Nayantara's husband; Preesha and Rudraksh's son; Ruhi's brother; Saransh's cousin; Revati’s adoptive son (2022–present)
 Bhuvan Garg: Rudra's lookalike (2021)

Recurring
Krish Chugh as Saransh Khurana: Rajeev and Mahima's son; Rudraksh and Preesha’s eldest adoptive son and nephew; Ruhi and Samrat's elder cousin and adopted brother (2021–2022) 
Vidhaan Sharma / Yagya Bhasin / Ali Dhuru as Child Saransh Khurana (2019–2021)
Swarna Pandey as Ruhi Khurana: Preesha and Rudraksh's daughter; Samrat's elder sister;Saransh's younger cousin and adoptive sister (2021–2022)
Mallika Nayak as Sharda Khurana: Balraj's widow; Rajeev and Rudraksh's step-mother;  Saransh, Ruhi and Samrat's step-grandmother (2019–2022)
 Poorva Gokhale as Commissioner Revati Choudhary: Rakesh's wife; Dev and Aliya's mother; Samrat’s adoptive mother (2022–2023)
 Pratichi Mishra as Malati Iyer: Nayantara and Ishaani’s mother; Chintu's adoptive mother (2022–present)
 Swati Sharma as Ishaani Shukla: Nayantara's sister; Malati's younger daughter; Chintu's adoptive sister; Mohit's love-interest who ends up sleeping with Raghav; Raghav's unborn child's mother.(2022–present)
Jayati Narula as Aliya Choudhary: Saransh's best friend; Revati and Rakesh's daughter; Dev's sister; Samrat's adoptive sister (2022–present)
Maisha Dixit as Child Aliya Choudhary (2022)
 Akshita Vatsayan as Kiara: Aliya's Best friend
 Ishita Ganguly as Manasi : Prem's mother; Raghav's ex-fiance (2023–present) 
 Kushagre Dua as Raghav Rathore: Manasi's ex-fiance,Ishani's unborn child's father; Samrat's Rival (2023) 
 Shaurya Sisodiya as Prem : Manasi's son  (2023–present)
 Bharat Ahlawat as Mohit Shukla: Seema and Subodh's son; Samrat’s secretary and best friend; Ishaani's husband and love interest (2022–present)
 Runav Shah as Chintu Iyer: Nayantara and Ishaani’s adopted brother; Malati's adoptive son (2022–present)
 Neeta Seth as Seema Subodh Shukla: Subodh's wife; Mohit's mother; Ishaani's mother-in-law (2022–present)
 Sarojini Deshmukh as Sudha Iyer 'Paati': Nayantara and Ishaani's grandmother; Chintu's adoptive grandmother; Malati's mother-in-law (2022–present) 
Indira Krishnan as Vasudha Srinivasan: Gopal's wife; Venky, Mahima and Preesha's mother; Saransh, Ruhi and Samrat's grandmother (2019–2022) 
Vijay Kashyap / Gulshan Pandey as Gopal Srinivasan: Retired Judge; Vasudha's husband; Venky, Mahima and Preesha's father; Yuvraj's ex-mentor; Saransh, Ruhi and Samrat's grandfather (2019–2022)
Siddharth Shivpuri as Advocate Yuvraj Pillai: Gopal's former employee; Preesha's ex-fiancé, Ahana's ex-husband (2019–2022)
Aishwarya Khare as Mahima Srinivasan: Vasudha and Gopal's elder daughter; Venky and Preesha's sister; Vaijanti's cousin sister; Rajeev's lover; Saransh's mother; Preesha's rival; Ishita's niece (2019–2021)
Prince Mahajan as Venkatesh "Venky" Srinivasan: Vasudha and Gopal's long-lost son; Mahima and Preesha's brother; Ishita's nephew, Vaijyanti's cousin (2021)
Krutika Desai as Advocate Vaijyanti Srinivasan: Gopal's niece; Venky, Mahima and Preesha's cousin (2021–2022)
Nitin Bhatia as Bhairavnath "Bunty" Gupta: Bubble's husband; Rudraksh's friend (2019–2022)
Jyoti Negi as Ankita "Bubble" Gupta: Bunty's wife; Preesha's friend (2019–2022)
Anjali Mukhi as Sulochana Khurana: Balraj's first wife; Kabir, Rajeev and Rudraksh's mother; Saransh,Ruhi and Samrat's grandmother (2019–2021)
Satyajit Sharma as Balraj Khurana: Sulochana's former husband; Sharda's husband; Kabir's step-father; Rajeev and Rudraksh's father; Saransh,Ruhi and Samrat's grandfather (2019–2021)(Dead)
Indraneil Sengupta as Rajeev Khurana: Sulochana and Balraj's elder son; Kabir's half-brother; Rudraksh's brother; Mahima's lover; Ahana's husband; Saransh's father (2019–2020)(Dead)
Aishwarya Sakhuja as Ahana Singhania Khurana: Niketan's daughter; Mishka's sister; Rajeev's widow;Yuvraj's ex-wife (2019–2021)
Tanu Khan as Mishka "Mish" Singhania Khurana: Niketan's daughter; Ahana's sister; Kabir's former wife; Param's fiancée (2019–2021)
Altamash Faraz as Armaan Thakur: A rich businessman; Devika's brother; Sanya's ex-husband; Pihu's cousin; Anvi's father (2021–2022)
Puvika Gupta as Anvi Thakur: Sanya and Armaan's daughter (2021)
Himani Sahani as Devika Thakur: Armaan's sister (2021)
Sonal Vengurlekar as Sanya Dubash Thakur: Armaan's former wife; Anvi's mother (2021)
Karan Kaushal Sharma as Digvijay Thakur: Kanchan's husband; Pihu's father; Armaan and Devika's uncle (2021–2022)
Pragati Chourasiya as Pihu Thakur: Kanchan and Digvijay's daughter; Armaan and Devika's cousin (2022)
Jeevansh Chadha as Vidyut Rohira: Rudraksh's maternal cousin; Sharda's nephew; Pihu's boyfriend (2022)
Milind Manek as Raj Bansal: Rudraksh's apprentice (2022–present)
Priyanka Choudhary as Keerti Jain aka Kittu: Sharda's friend's daughter (2020)
Khatija Iqbal as Kaveri Dubey: Surya's girlfriend; Rudraksh's fake girlfriend (2019–2020)
Rupesh Kataria as Suryadhar "Surya" Raina: Kaveri's boyfriend (2019–2020)
 Mridula Oberoi as Inspector Saachi Chautala: Armaan's friend (2021-2022)
Bikramjeet Kanwarpal as Niketan Singhania: Ahana and Mishka's father (2020)
Upen Chauhan as Rahul Arora: Rudraksh's business rival; Neerja's husband (2020)
Melanie Pais as Neerja Arora: Rahul's wife; Preesha's friend (2020)
Shabaaz Abdullah Badi as Arjun Verma: Mahima's former boyfriend (2020)
Trupti Mishra as Sonia Garg: Bhuvan's sister; Rudraksh's obsessed fan (2021)
Kushansk Arora as Kabir "Kabby" Khurana: Sulochana's son; Balraj's step-son; Rajeev and Rudraksh's half-brother; Mishka's former husband (2021)
Saksham Vasu as Sunny Bhattacharya: Saransh's imposter mentored by Yuvraj (2021)
Ankur Verma as Param Aneja: Rudraksh's friend; Mishka's fiancé (2021)
Yajuvendra Singh as Rakesh Choudhary: Revati's husband; Dev and Aliya's father; a rich business tycoon (2022)
Yash Acharya as Dev Choudhary: Revati and Rakesh's son; Aliya's brother; Ruhi and Saransh's bully and enemy (2022)
Juhi Singh Bajwa as Nalini Sinha: Rakesh's girlfriend (2022)
Preeti Chaudhary as Vanshika Chaudhary: Rudraksh's secretary and friend (2022)

Guests
Divyanka Tripathi as Dr. Ishita Bhalla from Yeh Hai Mohabbatein (2019)
Karan Patel as Raman Bhalla from Yeh Hai Mohabbatein (2019)
Sunny Kaushal as Sunny to promote his film Shiddat (2021)
Ashwini Kalsekar as Commissioner Deepali Handa from Rudra: The Edge of Darkness (2022)
Swati Rajput as Diya Mathur from Yeh Jhuki Jhuki Si Nazar (2022)
Neetha Shetty as Mayuri Ahuja (2022)

Production

Development and premiere
In June 2017, producer Ekta Kapoor revealed her plan for a spin-off of Yeh Hai Mohabbatein however stated, "I wanted to make a spin off of Yeh Hai Mohabbatein but it's not working out with the story line." The reports of the spin-off in making was then announced in April 2018. It was supposed to premiere in the same year but was delayed as the story was not finalized. Then, it was reported to premiere in June 2019 and the casting for it was going on while Aakanksha Singh and Karan Vohra were reported as the leads. But it was scrapped in July 2019. In September 2019, the series was revived and fresh casting sessions began. Sargun Kaur Luthra was cast as Dr. Preesha Srinivasan and Abrar Qazi was cast as Rudraksh Khurana.
Talking about the series, producer Ekta Kapoor said "Yeh Hai Chahatein deals with another social issue. It's often said that it's easier for men with children to get married again, but very tough for a woman with a child to find a suitable groom."

Release
The first promo of the series was released on 27 November 2019 where Sargun Kaur Luthra and Vidhaan Sharma were introduced by Divyanka Tripathi and Karan Patel as Dr. Preesha Srinivasan and Saransh Khurana. The next promo was released on 16 December 2019 featuring Abrar Qazi, Luthra and Vidhaan Sharma. The series premiered on 19 December 2019 on StarPlus.

Casting
Sargun Kaur Luthra was selected to play Dr. Preesha Srinivasan's character. Karan Wahi was approached to play Rudraksh Khurana, but Abrar Qazi was signed by the production team. Zebby Singh was potentially going to play Yuvraj Pillai before the role went to Siddharth Shivpuri. Parul Chauhan was supposed to play Ahana, but Aishwarya Sakhuja replaced her. When the shooting resumed after the COVID-19 outbreak, in early July 2020, Vidhaan Sharma was replaced by Yagya Bhasin as Saaransh and Gulshan Pandey replaced Vijay Kashyap as Gopal.

Luthra stated that she took inspiration from Neena Gupta for her role.
Talking about playing a mother for the first time, she said, "When I was told that I will be playing a mother, I wasn't apprehensive at all. My only worry was that i am very young and I had to look mature on the screen which was a challenge. The team has helped me a lot to help me look a certain age and moreover with my body language to portray this character. Even Vidhaan (my on-screen son), has helped bring out the best in me. More than mother-son, we are like friends off the screen."

Sakhuja was brought in for the negative role of Ahana which is her first negative role. Speaking about it she said, "I have auditioned for a lot of Balaji shows and whenever I auditioned for negative roles I was told I look very positive. So, when I bagged this role, I asked them why now? They said eventually you will get to know as to why we have chosen you, and I understand because they like to surprise their audience and that's exactly what they are doing. I was figuring how to go about it, but my team is helping. After every two sentences out of habit, I go into the positive zone but I have people to handhold me and help me."

In May 2021 Mister Supranational India Altamash Faraz was cast as Armaan Thakur.

Filming
Set in Delhi, the series is mainly filmed in Film City, Mumbai. On 3 August 2020, the shoot could not happen due to heavy rains in Mumbai and was cancelled.

On 13 April 2021, Chief Minister Uddhav Thackeray announced a sudden curfew which would be beginning from 15 April. On 14 April, Ekta Kapoor and Balaji Telefilms decided to move all their shows' shooting to their sets at Goa.

Broadcast
The production and airing of the show was halted indefinitely in late March 2020 due to the COVID-19 outbreak in India. The series was expected to resume on 1 April 2020 but could not and the series was last broadcast on 24 March 2020 airing its remaining episodes. After three months, the filming of the series resumed on 27 June 2020 while the broadcast resumed on 13 July 2020.

Television special

Ravivaar With Star Parivaar (2022) 

The cast of Yeh Hai Chahatein went on to participate in Ravivaar With Star Parivaar, a musical competition wherein eight StarPlus shows competed against each other to win the title of "Best Parivaar". Yeh Hain Chahtein emerged as a runner up in the show.

Adaptations

Reception

Ratings

UK 
The first episode of the show in its debut week was watched by 52.7 K viewers being the most watched Indian television show in UK on the day. The show again became the most watched on 16 January 2020 with 76.5K viewers. The show became the most watched show with 61.5 K viewers on 6 March 2020. On 18 August 2020, it became the most watched show with the viewership of 70.1 K.
It become second most watched show on 4 December 2020 with 71.6 K viewers. The series crossed 100 K viewers for the first time on 25 January 2021 with 105.1 K viewers being the second most watched show.

Awards and nominations

Soundtrack

Yeh Hai Chahatein'''s soundtrack is composed by Lalit Sen and Nawab Arzoo. They had composed the original songs and the background score for the show. Yeh Hai Chahatein'', the title song of the show is sung by Palak Muchhal and Siddharth Slathia.

References

External links

Yeh Hai Chahatein on Hotstar

Balaji Telefilms television series
2019 Indian television series debuts
Indian television spin-offs
Indian romance television series
Indian television soap operas
StarPlus original programming